Knud Hallest (12 May 1909 – 4 September 1991) was a Danish film actor. He appeared in 38 films between 1935 and 1974. He was born in Copenhagen, Denmark and died in Denmark.

Filmography

 Pigen og drømmeslottet (1974)
 Skygger (1972)
 Solens børn (1972)
 Mindesmærket (1972)
 Sangen om den røde rubin (1970)
 Ta' lidt solskin (1969)
 Champagne galoppen (1969)
 Min søsters børn vælter byen (1968)
 Lille mand, pas på (1968)
 Min søsters børn på bryllupsrejse (1967)
 Hold da helt ferie (1965)
 I brændingen (1965)
 En ven i bolignøden (1965)
 Slottet (1964)
 The Keeler Affair (1963)
 Frøken April (1963)
 Der brænder en ild (1962)
 Drømmen om det hvide slot (1962)
 Landsbylægen (1961)
 Eventyr på Mallorca (1961)
 Komtessen (1961)
 Reptilicus (1961)
 Eventyrrejsen (1960)
 Det skete på Møllegården (1960)
 Pigen i søgelyset (1959)
 Helle for Helene (1959)
 Styrmand Karlsen (1958)
 Laan mig din kone (1957)
 Natlogi betalt (1957)
 Hidden Fear (1957)
 Ild og jord (1955)
 Arvingen (1954)
 Himlen er blaa (1954)
 Fløjtespilleren (1953)
 Bag de røde porte (1951)
 De røde heste (1950)
 Sommerglæder (1940)
 Min kone er husar (1935)

External links

1909 births
1991 deaths
Danish male film actors
Male actors from Copenhagen
20th-century Danish male actors